Flavian (Phlabianos;  11 August 449), sometimes Flavian I, was Archbishop of Constantinople from 446 to 449. He is venerated as a saint by the Eastern Orthodox Church and the Catholic Church.

Consecration as archbishop and imperial dispute 
Flavian was a presbyter and the guardian of the sacred vessels of the great Church of Constantinople and, according to Nikephoros Kallistos Xanthopoulos, was reputed to lead a saintly life, when he was chosen to succeed Proclus as Archbishop of Constantinople.

During his consecration, Roman Emperor Theodosius II was staying at Chalcedon. His eunuch Chrysaphius attempted to extort a present of gold to the Emperor but as he was unsuccessful, he began to plot against the new Archbishop by supporting the archimandrite Eutyches in his dispute with Flavian.

Home Synod of Constantinople 
Flavian presided at a council of forty bishops at Constantinople on November 8, 448, to resolve a dispute between the metropolitan bishop of Sardis and two bishops of his province. Eusebius, bishop of Dorylaeum, presented an indictment against Eutyches. The speech of Flavian remains, concluding with this appeal to the bishop of Dorylaeum: "Let your reverence condescend to visit him and argue with him about the true faith, and if he shall be found in very truth to err, then he shall be called to our holy assembly, and shall answer for himself." Eventually the synod deposed Eutyches.

Second Council of Ephesus 
However, as Eutyches protested against this verdict and received the support of Pope Dioscorus I of Alexandria, the Emperor convoked another Council to Ephesus. At this council, which assembled on August 8, 449, Flavian was beaten during the sessions of this council by impudent monks led by a certain Barsumas.  Flavian was then deposed, exiled, and the council reinstated Eutyches.

Death 
Flavian died on August 11, 449, at Hypaepa in Lydia, Asia Minor and was buried obscurely.

Aftermath
Pope Leo I, whose legates had been ignored at the council, protested, first calling the council a "robber synod", and declared its decisions void.

After Theodosius II died in 450, his sister Pulcheria returned to power, marrying the officer Marcian, who became Emperor. The new Imperial couple had Flavian's remains brought to Constantinople in a way that, in the words of a chronicler, more resembled "a triumph .. than a funeral procession". The Council of Chalcedon, called in 451, condemned Eutyches, confirmed Pope Leo's Tome (letter 28) and canonized Flavian as a martyr.

In the Roman Catholic Church St. Flavian is commemorated on February 18, the date assigned to him in the Roman Martyrology.  Flavian of Ricina is sometimes identified with him.

See also
 St Fravitta of Constantinople, known as Flavian or Flavianus II in some sources

References

Attribution

 Evagrius. ii. 2. etc.
 Facund, Pro Trib. Capit. viii. 5; xii. 5.
 Leo. Mag. Epp. 23, 26, 27, 28, 44.
 Liberatus Diac. Breviar. xi. xii.
 Nicephorus, Constant. xiv. 47.
 Sozomen H. E. ix. 1.
 Theophanes the Confessor, Chronology pp. 84–88.

Bibliography

External links
St Flavian of Constantinople Orthodox Synaxarion (February 18)

449 deaths
Flavian
Ancient Christians involved in controversies
5th-century Christian martyrs
Year of birth unknown